I Kissed a Girl  is a 2015 French comedy film directed by Noémie Saglio and Maxime Govare. The film's original title "Toute première fois" refers to a gay man's first time having sex with a woman and is the story of a gay man who is engaged, but considers leaving his boyfriend after beginning an affair with a woman.

Plot 
Jérémie (Pio Marmaï), a Parisian gay man, unexpectedly finds himself waking up in bed in an apartment he doesn't know, next to a woman he's never met. To his surprise, he discovers that he has had a drunken one-night stand with a beautiful Swedish woman (Adrianna Gradziel) named Adna. This is the first time with a woman for Jérémie, who is happily engaged to his boyfriend Antoine (Lannick Gautry). What follows in the story of Jérémie's "coming in", as the now sexually confused gay man begins to question his sexuality as he falls in love with a woman for the first time. Jérémie's burgeoning romance with Adna threatens to foil the upcoming nuptials as Antoine becomes increasingly suspicious. Jérémie is faced with the choice of staying gay and getting married or going straight and upending his life. He confesses the affair to his heterosexual male friend Charles (Franck Gastambide), who suggests that Jérémie may be bisexual and encourages him to continue the relationship. Following Charles' advice, Jérémie continues his affair with Adna to see if his attraction to her is genuine. As the wedding day approaches and his relationship of 10 years begins to fray, Jérémie is forced to confess his infidelity to Antoine. He leaves Antoine to be with Adna. With his gay relationship over, Jérémie decides to come out of the closet to reveal his bisexuality to the world.

Cast 
 Pio Marmaï as Jérémie Deprez 
 Franck Gastambide as Charles  
 Adrianna Gradziel as Adna  
 Lannick Gautry as Antoine   
 Camille Cottin as Clémence 
 Frédéric Pierrot as Hubert Deprez 
 Isabelle Candelier as Françoise Deprez 
 Sébastien Castro as Nounours
 Nicole Ferroni as Sarah Deprez
 Étienne Guiraud as Jean

References

External links 
 

2015 comedy films
2015 LGBT-related films
2015 films
Adultery in films
French comedy films
2010s French-language films
French LGBT-related films
Gaumont Film Company films
Gay-related films
Male bisexuality in film
2010s French films